Chinese Million Star is a Taiwanese singing reality-competition based on the previous program, One Million Star. The series was a Remake of One Million Star and adapting competition format based on the seven seasons.

After seven seasons of One Million Star, a Taiwanese televised singing competition named Chinese Million Star begins its search for a new superstar. produced by Gin Star Entertainment, and aired on CTV (China Television Company, Ltd). Most of the competition remains similar to the original counterpart of One Million Star as well as the judges. The series employs a panel of judges who critique the contestants' performances, which were Yuan Wei Jen, Kay Huang, Albert Leung, James Li and David Tao. The series is hosted by Mathilda Tao, who she previously hosted One Million Star. The competition is open to singers worldwide. The top prize is a cash payout of  along with various prizes. The three winners were Sharon Kwan, Max Lin, and Chen Haoyu.

To date, three seasons were broadcast with the first season aired on July 3, 2011, and ended January 15, 2012. In August 2014, CTV and the show's producer James Chan announced that the series would not be renewed for a fourth season, due to budget constraints and viewership ratings. However, Taiwan later produced several spin-offs for the program called Million Star and Jungle Voice, which had seen international success.

Rules
Like One Million Star, Chinese Million Star has rounds that contest singers based on the abilities and talent. Each week is tied to a theme and singers had to perform for the five judges who will score them, with a maximum score of 30 (each judge can award a singer up to six points). Singers who do not perform well with scores fell below a quota (which starts at 15 and raises in later weeks) will land them in the "Elimination Zone", where they were placed in risk of elimination; judges will then eliminate singers who performed the worst in most weeks except for non-elimination weeks. Various weeks were as shown over the course of Chinese Million Star:

Auditions
Singers sang their song pre-recorded in a television screen which is seen by the five judges. Singers had to receive at least three stars from the panel under 30 seconds to advance. If the singer received only two stars, s/he may also be entitled for a secondary performance. Each judge also have a save to exercise on their own, to save a contestant from elimination.

Sing-off
Singers compete with each other in a Sing-off and performed songs. Singers who lost the sing-off, along with contestants who did not score a quota (usually 15 points), will land the contestant in the "Elimination Zone".

Themed weeks
Themed weeks do not have a sing-off, and singers compete in their own in one song. Singers must score above the quota to advance.

Cumulative Rounds
Towards the end of the competition, singers compete over the next four themed weeks with the scores accumulating in each performance. Elimination occurs on the semi-final week and on the first round of the grand finals, and singers received a lower total will be eliminated. Four remaining singers who advanced to the second round of the grand finals will decide the winner based on the weightage of the scores from the previous cumulative rounds (40% based on all the scores from the first four themed weeks, and 30% from each of the rounds in the grand final).

Series overview
To date, three seasons had been broadcast as follows:

Contestants who appeared on other programs

See also
One Million Star

Taiwanese television series
China Television original programming
Singing competitions
Singing talent shows
+